François de Cuvilliés the Younger (24 October 1731 – 10 January 1777) was a German architect, engraver, draftsman, engineer, and author. He was the son of François de Cuvilliés (the Elder).

Biography
He was born in Munich on 24 October 1731. Cuvilliés the Younger was trained by his father and later studied at the Académie royale d'architecture in Paris. In 1757 he got a job at the electoral court in Munich, around 1765 he was promoted to Captain of Engineers. He was in the service of his father until, after his death in 1768, he became second chief master builder behind Karl Albert von Lespilliez. His works lead from late Rococo to early Classicism, following the October 1770 mandate of Maximilian III Joseph, Elector of Bavaria, whereby he practically forbade Rococo as a "ridiculous" ornament for country churches and called for a "noble simplicity".

Cuvilliés the Younger continued to publish ornamental prints based on the works of his father. His incomplete textbook Vitruve bavarois, named after a textbook by the Roman architect Vitruvius, was a model for various artists of different disciplines.

Works
 1769: Alte Hauptwache at Marienplatz (Thomass-Eck) in Munich
 1771–1777: Pfarrkirche Zell an der Pram
 1771–1780: Abbey church of Kloster Asbach
 1774: Neues Landschaftsgebäude in Munich

Gallery

Further reading
 Dietmar Hundt, Elisabeth Ettelt: François de Cuvilliés d. Ä., François de Cuvilliés d. J. (Kleine Pannonia-Reihe; Bd. 139). Pannonia-Verlag, Freilassing 1990, ISBN 3-7897-0139-4.
 Andrea Rueth: François de Cuvilliés d. J. In: Jürgen Wurst, Alexander Langheiter (Hrsg.): „Monachia“ von Carl Theodor von Piloty. Städtische Galerie im Lenbachhaus, München 2005. S. 106–107. ISBN 3-88645-156-9.
 Johannes Schnell: François de Cuvilliés’ Schule Bayerischer Architektur. Ein Beitrag zum Stichwerk und zur Architekturtheorie beider Cuvilliés. Dissertation, Universität München 1961.

References

External links
 

1731 births
1777 deaths
18th-century German architects
18th-century German sculptors
18th-century German male artists
German male sculptors
German people of Flemish descent
People from Munich
German engineers
German writers
German engravers